Luka Gadrani (Georgian: ლუკა გადრანი; born 12 april 1997, in Georgia) is a Georgian footballer who now plays for Aktobe in Kazakhstan.

Career
Gadrani started his senior career with Tskhinvali. After that, he played for Rustavi. In 2019, he signed for Shahin Bushehr in the Iranian Persian Gulf Pro League, where he has made fourteen league appearances and scored zero goals.

References

External links 
 Kvilitaia and Gadran will play against Weiss in Iran. Good conditions, infrastructure and football environment. Georgian Derby is in the first round 
 Luka Gadran: I am told in "Alaves" that you may be given a chance to play in La Liga, but...
 Luca Gadran is in Alaves and is waiting for permission to play from FIFA 

Living people
1997 births
Footballers from Georgia (country)
Expatriate footballers from Georgia (country)
Expatriate footballers in Iran
FC Spartaki Tskhinvali players
FC Metalurgi Rustavi players
Shahin Bushehr F.C. players
Association football defenders